HD 121504 b is an exoplanet that is likely to be slightly less massive than Jupiter. Although the radial velocity method that was used to detect the planet can only measure the minimum mass of the planet, it is very unlikely that its true mass would be much higher.

HD 121504 b orbits the star at a distance of about one third of Earth's distance from the Sun, and has a slightly eccentric orbit.

References

External links
 
 

Exoplanets discovered in 2000
Giant planets
Centaurus (constellation)
Exoplanets detected by radial velocity